Llanbradach and Pwllypant is a community in the county of Caerphilly, South Wales. It includes the large village of Llanbradach and Pwll-y-Pant.

It has a community council.

References

Communities in Caerphilly County Borough